West Hill railway station (code: WH) is a railway station in Kozhikode district, Kerala and falls under the Palakkad railway division of the Southern Railway zone, Indian Railways.

Railway stations in Kozhikode district
Transport in Kozhikode
Buildings and structures in Kozhikode